Nelson (formerly, Nelson Station) is an unincorporated community in Butte County, California. Nelson's first post office was established in 1873; its zip code is 95958. The place was founded in 1873 by the California and Oregon Railroad Company and named for an early settler, A.D. Nelson.

References

Unincorporated communities in California
Unincorporated communities in Butte County, California
Populated places established in 1873